KRI Teluk Calang (524) is a  of the Indonesian Navy.

Characteristics
She has a capacity of 476 passengers, including crew, alongside 10 Leopard main battle tanks and a helicopter. The ship was designed to be able to stay at sea for 20 days. The ship is armed with light defensive weapons in form of a Bofors 40 mm gun and two 12.7 mm heavy machine guns. The vessel could also carry four LCVP boats, and is equipped with a crane for cargo loading and offloading.

Service history
KRI Teluk Calang was built by an Indonesian shipbuilder PT Daya Radar Utama (DRU), Bandar Lampung. The ship was ordered from DRU as part of a three-ship order of the Teluk Bintuni-class ships (AT-117 type LST program) in January 2017, with yard number of AT-7. The ship was laid down on 10 July 2017, along with two other ships, AT-5 and AT-6. She was launched and officially named on 19 August 2019. The ship was commissioned on 8 August 2022.

References

2019 ships
Teluk Bintuni-class tank landing ships
Amphibious warfare vessels of the Indonesian Navy